James Harvey Rothrock (June 1, 1829 – January 14, 1899) was an American judge and politician.

A native of Milroy, Pennsylvania, born on June 1, 1829, he and his family moved to Ohio in 1838, where they farmed. As a child, Rothrock only attended school during the winters. When he turned eighteen, he enrolled in school at New Richmond, and was later accepted to Franklin University. When university classes were not in session, Rothrock worked as a schoolteacher. In 1852, he left Franklin, opting to read law in West Union. Two years later, Rothrock passed the Columbus bar. He served a single term as prosecutor for Highland County before moving to Iowa in 1860.

Rothrock settled in Tipton, Iowa, in 1860. By the fall of 1861, he had been elected to the Iowa House of Representatives. He served as a Republican legislator for District 33. After Rush Clark vacated the speakership for health reasons, Rothrock was elected speaker pro-term. Upon completing his only term as a state representative, Samuel J. Kirkwood offered Rothrock the rank of colonel in the 35th Iowa Infantry Regiment. He refused the rank, but did serve with the regiment during the Siege of Vicksburg. Rothrock caught typhoid fever during the engagement, and after recovering, returned to the practice of law in Iowa alongside W. P. Wolf. Rothrock was appointed to the eighth district court judgeship in 1866 and succeeded by John Shane upon his elevation as a justice of the Iowa Supreme Court from February 24, 1876, to December 31, 1896, appointed from Cedar County, Iowa. Rothrock refused a nomination for a second term on the Iowa Supreme Court, and died on January 14, 1899.

References

Justices of the Iowa Supreme Court
19th-century American politicians
Franklin University alumni
Farmers from Ohio
Republican Party members of the Iowa House of Representatives
19th-century American judges
People from Mifflin County, Pennsylvania
People from Tipton, Iowa
1899 deaths
People of Iowa in the American Civil War
1829 births
19th-century American educators
Schoolteachers from Ohio
Speakers of the Iowa House of Representatives
County district attorneys in Ohio
19th-century American lawyers